Mud Spring may refer to:
 a former name of El Dorado, California
 a location in Garrison, Utah that is on the National Register of Historic Places
 Mud Spring (Antelope Valley) Los Angeles County, California.
 Wootton Bassett Mud Spring in England